Holy Trinity Academy (HTA), also referred to as the Most Holy Trinity Academy, or colloquially as Holy, is a private parochial co-educational school in Sampaloc, Manila, Philippines. The school was established in June 1947 by Rev. Fr. Bernardo Torres. The school accepted both male and female students, but in separate departments, until it became fully co-educational in 1976.

The school currently maintains a Level 2 accreditation from the Philippine Accrediting Association of Schools, Colleges, and Universities (PAASCU) since its approval in December 2015. The school is part of the Roman Catholic Archdiocese of Manila Educational System (RCAMES), an educational system and a group of catholic and parochial schools governed by Roman Catholic Archdiocese of Manila, where the school is under the fourth cluster, headed by the school's director, Rev. Fr. Marion C. Munda.

Holy Trinity Academy offers the K–12 curriculum program. In the Senior High School Department, the school offers five academic tracks, which prepares students for college and their chosen undergraduate program. In the school year 2019–2020, the school served a population of around 3,000 enrollees annually in its preparatory, elementary, and high school departments.

Some of the HTA alumni have been recognized for their works in arts, media, filmmaking, and science, including, Lexi Gonzales, Mon Gualvez, and Kyxz Mendiola.

History 

Before the establishment of the school in 1947, the site was the Balic-Balic Cemetery, created in 1884 and closed in 1913.

Holy Trinity Academy was established in June 1947; in which, its foundation was ascribed to Rev. Fr. Bernardo Torres, the incumbent parish priest of Iglesia de Santissima Trinidad at the time (now Most Holy Trinity Parish). The Franciscan Sisters was also credited with the foundation of the school in 1947. Two Franciscan Sisters of the SFIC congregation were the first few people to work at the school as teachers for two years.

In 1958, the management of the school was turned over to the Daughters of Mary Help of Christians (later known as the Salesian Sisters of Don Bosco) by Rufino Santos, the incumbent Cardinal of Archdiocese of Manila at the time. The Salesian Sisters set up co-educational classes from Kindergarten to Grade 4, and separate sections for females in Grades 5–6. They stayed in the school for 30 years, managing Kindergarten to Grade 6 classes, and later the separate HTA Girl's Department in 1964.

During the directorship of Msgr. Isidro L. Jose in 1962, he had a plan of accommodating all children of school age. In 1964, the HTA Boy's Department was set up, under the supervision of the lay administrators. In the school year 1972–1973, the HTA Boy's Department started kindergarten classes.

In June 2021 a groundbreaking ceremony for a new ten-storey building was held.

During the COVID-19 pandemic that started in 2020, Holy Trinity Academy was part of Manila's 24/7 vaccination service which started on August 9, 2021, administering 2,000 doses of COVID-19 vaccines to people in the A1 to A5 priority groups.

Academics

Accreditation 
Holy Trinity Academy currently holds a Level 2 accreditation from the Philippine Accrediting Association of Schools, Colleges, and Universities (PAASCU).

Academic tracks 
Holy Trinity Academy offers 5 academic tracks that prepares students for college and their preferred undergraduate program in the Senior High School Department for 2 years.
 Accountancy, Business and Management (ABM)
 Science, Technology, Engineering, and Mathematics (STEM)
 Humanities and Social Sciences (HUMSS)
 Technical-Vocational and Livelihood (TVL)
Information and Communications Technology (ICT)
Home Economics and Livelihood Education (HELE)
 General Academic Strand (GAS)

Campus 

The campus of Holy Trinity Academy consists of estimated 1.75 hectares (17,500 m²) of land in Sampaloc, Manila, bounded by Sobriedad Street to the northwest, Calabash Road to the northeast, Firmeza Street to the southeast, and T. Anzures to the southwest. It was previously used as a cemetery. The campus is a kilometer (0.62 mi) away from Manila's neighboring city, Quezon City.

The campus has four major buildings for teaching and one for religious gatherings. The Grade School Building is the biggest building in the campus, followed by the High School Building, the Annex Building, the Most Holy Trinity Parish, and the HTA Gymnasium.

The overall worth of HTA facilities and buildings was never disclosed publicly; however, it was revealed that one of its major facilities, the HTA Gymnasium, cost ₱8.8 million pesos at the time of construction in 2001.

Most Holy Trinity Parish is the oldest structure inside the campus, built in 1890 as a funerary chapel and rebuilt in 1925.

Administration 

Holy Trinity Academy is governed by 6-person Board of Trustees, as well as a 22-person school administrators, 12 of them being academic and institutional coordinators.

The current school director is Rev. Fr. Marion C. Munda, the tenth to hold the title. The current assistant school director is Rev. Fr. Leo Angelo S. Ignacio, Ed.D.

Culture and traditions

HTA Hymn 
The Holy Trinity Academy Hymn (often shortened to as HTA Hymn, also occasionally referred to as the Glorious Song) is the school's hymn.

Notable people 
People associated with the school either as students, faculty members, or administrators are known as "Trinitarians" or colloquially "HTAcians." Some people associated with Holy Trinity Academy have been known in artistry, media, filmmaking, journalism, science, and as a world record attempter.

HTA alumni includes Lexi Gonzales, an actress, singer, and dancer, known for being hailed as the First Princess on the seventh season of the Philippine reality talent competition, StarStruck. She was previously part of ABS-CBN's talent management arm of Star Magic, where she has been part of several TV show, that includes: Magpahanggang Wakas, Pusong Ligaw, Maalaala Mo Kaya, Ipaglaban Mo and The Good Son as either an extra or an uncredited guest cast. Gonzales now appears in the Philippine variety show, All-Out Sundays of GMA Network as a recurring cast.

Mon Gualvez, who graduated Holy Trinity Academy in 2007, is known as a recurring news anchor and correspondent for TV5. He is currently the head anchor in the Philippine hourly news bulletin, News5 Alerts, previously known as Aksyon Ngayon. Gualvez also serves as an instructor in the Senior High School Department for Humanities and Social Sciences.

Filipino inventor, Kyxz Mendiola, who also attended Holy Trinity Academy, notable as a founding member of a former Filipino hip-hop group, Philippine All Stars, a filmmaker, and for inventing and developing an ultralight aircraft, Koncepto Milenya, which broke a world record for longest flight by hoverboard in 2021, surpassing the Guinness World record set by Franky Zapata who flew a jet-powered hoverboard across a distance of 2.25 km in 2016.

References

Footnotes

Citations

Works cited

External links 

 Holy Trinity Academy official website (limited access only)
 Holy Trinity Academy official website (2015 archive at the Wayback Machine)
 Holy Trinity Academy on Facebook

Roman Catholic Archdiocese of Manila Educational System
Educational institutions established in 1947
1947 establishments in the Philippines
Private schools in Manila
Catholic elementary schools in Manila
Catholic secondary schools in Manila
Elementary schools in Manila
High schools in Manila
Education in Sampaloc, Manila
Former cemeteries